Michael Theodore "Stinger" Glenn (born September 10, 1955) is an American former professional basketball player.

College career
Moving on to Southern Illinois University, Glenn was an All-Missouri Valley Conference college basketball player, graduating with honors and a B.S. degree in mathematics (minoring in computer science) in 1977.

Professional career
He would go on to play ten seasons (1977–1987) in the National Basketball Association as a member of the Buffalo Braves, New York Knicks, Atlanta Hawks, and Milwaukee Bucks.

Drafted twenty-third overall by the Chicago Bulls in 1977, Glenn broke his neck in an offseason auto accident and was released from the team. He battled back to make a quick recovery, though, starting his NBA career later that same year with the Buffalo Braves. In 1978, Glenn signed with the New York Knicks; during his time in New York City, Glenn attended graduate business classes at St. John's University and Baruch College, earning his stockbroker's license. Over the course on his NBA career, Glenn averaged 7.6 points per game while shooting 54.2% from the field. He was noted for his smooth midrange jump shot, which not only contributed to his high shooting percentage (an amazing mark for a 6'3" guard), but also earned him the nickname "The Stinger" early in his career from his Knicks teammates. In 1981, Glenn received the J. Walter Kennedy Citizenship Award for community service.

NBA career statistics

Regular season

|-
| align="left" | 1977–78
| align="left" | Buffalo
| 56 || - || 16.9 || .527 || - || .785 || 1.4 || 1.4 || 0.6 || 0.1 || 7.9
|-
| align="left" | 1978–79
| align="left" | New York
| 75 || - || 15.6 || .541 || - || .905 || 1.1 || 1.8 || 0.5 || 0.1 || 7.8
|-
| align="left" | 1979–80
| align="left" | New York
| 75 || - || 10.7 || .516 || .200 || .863 || 0.9 || 1.1 || 0.5 || 0.1 || 5.9
|-
| align="left" | 1980–81
| align="left" | New York
| 82 || - || 18.4 || .558 || .364 || .891 || 1.1 || 1.3 || 0.9 || 0.1 || 8.2
|-
| align="left" | 1981–82
| align="left" | Atlanta
| 49 || 0 || 17.0 || .543 || .500 || .881 || 1.2 || 1.8 || 0.5 || 0.1 || 7.7
|-
| align="left" | 1982–83
| align="left" | Atlanta
| 73 || 4 || 15.4 || .518 || .000 || .831 || 1.2 || 1.7 || 0.4 || 0.1 || 7.3
|-
| align="left" | 1983–84
| align="left" | Atlanta
| 81 || 0 || 18.6 || .563 || .500 || .800 || 1.3 || 2.1 || 0.6 || 0.1 || 8.4
|-
| align="left" | 1984–85
| align="left" | Atlanta
| 60 || 5 || 18.8 || .588 || .000 || .816 || 1.4 || 2.0 || 0.5 || 0.0 || 8.6
|-
| align="left" | 1985–86
| align="left" | Milwaukee
| 38 || 1 || 15.1 || .495 || .000 || .959 || 1.5 || 1.0 || 0.2 || 0.1 || 6.2
|-
| align="left" | 1986–87
| align="left" | Milwaukee
| 4 || 0 || 8.5 || .385 || .000 || .714 || 0.5 || 0.3 || 0.3 || 0.0 || 3.8
|- class="sortbottom"
| style="text-align:center;" colspan="2"| Career
| 593 || 10 || 16.2 || .542 || .286 || .855 || 1.2 || 1.6 || 0.5 || 0.1 || 7.6
|}

Playoffs

|-
| align="left" | 1980–81
| align="left" | New York
| 2 || - || 13.0 || .571 || .000 || 1.000 || 2.0 || 0.5 || 0.5 || 0.0 || 5.5
|-
| align="left" | 1981–82
| align="left" | Atlanta
| 2 || - || 17.5 || .714 || .000 || 1.000 || 0.5 || 1.0 || 1.5 || 0.0 || 6.0
|-
| align="left" | 1982–83
| align="left" | Atlanta
| 3 || - || 22.3 || .545 || .000 || 1.000 || 1.7 || 1.0 || 0.7 || 0.0 || 9.3
|-
| align="left" | 1983–84
| align="left" | Atlanta
| 5 || - || 10.6 || .357 || .000 || .000 || 1.0 || 1.0 || 0.4 || 0.0 || 2.0
|-
| align="left" | 1985–86
| align="left" | Milwaukee
| 10 || 0 || 11.4 || .361 || .000 || .833 || 1.1 || 0.8 || 0.1 || 0.0 || 3.6
|- class="sortbottom"
| style="text-align:center;" colspan="2"| Career
| 22 || 0 || 13.4 || .453 || .000 || .905 || 1.2 || 0.9 || 0.4 || 0.0 || 4.4
|}

Post-retirement
Since retiring as a basketball player, Glenn has worked as a television analyst, writer, and commissioner of the World Basketball Association. Because of his business background, Glenn was also employed in the early 1990s by Merrill Lynch as a consultant for the NBA's pre-pension plan. He currently runs the Mike Glenn All-Star Basketball Camp for the Hearing-Impaired, which is the nation's first basketball camp for deaf athletes and is offered every summer, free of charge, to as many as 120 deaf athletes from across the country. He worked as the Atlanta Hawks' color commentator on SportSouth and FSN from 1992–2005, and now serves as the Hawks' pregame and postgame analyst on FSN South.

In addition to his basketball-related work, Glenn is also an avid collector of artifacts pertaining to African-American history. He maintains a large personal library on the subject, and has displayed his collection in exhibits across the country. Using sources from his library, Glenn has written several biographical books on famous African-Americans.

References

Bibliography

External links
MikeGlenn.com
Catching Up With Mike Glenn
Career statistics

1955 births
Living people
20th-century African-American sportspeople
21st-century African-American people
African-American basketball players
American men's basketball players
Atlanta Hawks announcers
Atlanta Hawks players
Basketball players from Georgia (U.S. state)
Buffalo Braves players
Chicago Bulls draft picks
Milwaukee Bucks players
New York Knicks players
Point guards
Southern Illinois Salukis men's basketball players
Sportspeople from Rome, Georgia
Stockbrokers